Bansberia Assembly constituency was an assembly constituency in Hooghly district in the Indian state of West Bengal.

Overview
As a consequence of the orders of the Delimitation Commission Bansh Baria(Vidhan Sabha constituency) ceased to exist from 2011 and a new constituency Saptagram Assembly constituency came into being.

Members of Legislative Assembly

Election results

1977-2006
In 2006 and 2001 state assembly elections Asutosh Mukhopadhyay of CPI(M) won the 187 Bansberia assembly seat defeating his nearest rivals Suma Mukherjee and Tapan Dasgupta, both of Trinamool Congress in respective years. Robin Mukherjee of Congress defeated Prabir Sengupta of CPI(M) in 1996. Prabir Sengupta of CPI(M) defeated Robin Mukherjee of Congress in 1991 and 1987, Shibani Maitra of Congress in 1982 and Sanat Majumdar of Janata Party in 1977.

References

Former assembly constituencies of West Bengal
Politics of Hooghly district